Emily Skinner may refer to:
 Emily Skinner (actress, born 1970), American Tony-nominated stage actress from Virginia
 Emily Skinner (actress, born 2002), American actress from California; known for her roles as Amber in Disney Channel's Andi Mack and Diana in Brat's Total Eclipse

See also
 Emily (disambiguation)
 Skinner (surname)